Fiesta is the fourth studio album by the Chilean band Fiskales Ad-Hok, launched in 1998, under the new CFA (Corporation Phonographic Autonomous), independent label created by the same Fiskales Ad-Hok.

In April 2008, the Chilean edition of Rolling Stone placed this album as the 42nd best album of all time Chilean.

Track listing
 "Caldo E`Caeza"
 "Campanitas"
 "Fiesta"
 "Odio"
 "Tan Fácil"
 "Gracias"
 "Gordo"
 "Lorea Elvis"
 "Al Puerto"
 "Ponk"
 "La Mancha del Jaguar"
 "Cuando Muera"
 "Incoherencias"
 "Resistiré"
 "La Cumbia de Pancho"

Personnel
Alvaro España – vocals
Vibora – guitar
Micky – drums
Roly Urzua – bass

References

Fiskales Ad-Hok albums
1998 albums
Spanish-language albums